John Waterloo Wilson (1 September 1879 – 15 March 1940) was a Dutch sport shooter who competed at the 1908 Summer Olympics.

He was born in Bennebroek and died in Amsterdam.

In 1908 he finished fourth with the Dutch team in the team trap shooting event. In the individual trap competition he finished seventh.

The city of Brussels has a street named Rue John Waterloo Wilson after his grandfather John W. Wilson, who left 27 paintings to the City of Brussels.

References

External links
list of Dutch shooters

1879 births
1940 deaths
Dutch male sport shooters
Olympic shooters of the Netherlands
Shooters at the 1908 Summer Olympics
Trap and double trap shooters
People from Bennebroek
Sportspeople from North Holland
20th-century Dutch people